Deadlock is a 1931 British crime film directed by George King and starring Stewart Rome, Marjorie Hume and Warwick Ward. It is on the British Film Institute's list of the 75 Most Wanted list of lost films.

Plot
A murder takes place in a film studio during the shooting of a new film.

Cast
 Stewart Rome as James Whitelaw 
 Marjorie Hume as Mrs Whitelaw 
 Warwick Ward as Markham Savage 
 Annette Benson as Madeleine d'Arblay 
 Esmond Knight as John Tring 
Janice Adair as Joan Whitelaw
 Alma Taylor as Mrs. Tring 
 Cameron Carr as Tony Makepeace 
 Hay Plumb as Publicist 
 Pauline Peters as Maid 
 Kiyoshi Takase as Taki 
 Philip Godfrey as Nifty Weekes 
 Harold Saxon-Snell as Prosecutor

Production
It was shot at Hepworth studios and financed by F.W. Baker.

References

External links

BFI 75 Most Wanted entry, with extensive notes

1931 films
British black-and-white films
1931 crime films
Films directed by George King
Lost British films
British crime films
1931 lost films
1930s English-language films
1930s British films
Lost crime films